Griffin is a surname of Irish, English and Welsh origin. Griffin was the 75th most common surname on the island of Ireland in 1891. It was estimated in 2000 that Griffin is the 114th most common surname in the U.S., with a population in the order of two hundred thousand.

Griffin in Ireland
The surname "Griffin" has a number of Gaelic sources in Ireland.

Ó Gríofa
The spelling Ó Gríofa (male) or Ní Ghríofa (female) is associated with the Co. Clare family, whose surname was also anglicised as O'Griffey or O'Griffy. Ó Gríofa translates to English as "descendant of the Griffin-like".

Prior to the Irish spelling review, Ó Gríofa was spelt Ó Gríobhtha. The Ó Gríofa were chieftains of the Cineal Cuallachta branch of the Dál gCais, or Dalcassians, with their castle at Ballygriffy located in North Ballygriffey, Dysert (formerly the barony of Inchiquin). The Ó Gríofa are of the same stock as the O'Deas and the O'Quins, who belong to the Cineal Fearmaic, or more appropriately, the Ui Fearmaic.

Ó Grifín
The "Ó Grifín" (male) / "Ní Ghrifín" (female) spelling belongs to the Kerry family. The Kerry Griffins are descendants of Gallowglasses who fought in the Desmond Rebellions against the English.

Ó Gríofáin
Found along the Mayo, Roscommon and Galway border.

Griffith
In Ireland, the surname Griffin can also be associated with the Welsh surname "Griffith", but to a much lesser degree.

Griffin in Wales
The surname "Griffin" in Wales, generally speaking, is a variant of the surname "Griffith", or other similar Welsh names.

Notable people with the surname

A
Adrian Griffin (born 1974), American basketball player
Alan Griffin (politician) (born 1960), Australian politician
Alex Griffin (born 1971), English guitarist
Alfredo Griffin (born 1957), Dominican Republic baseball player
Alistair Griffin (born 1977), English singer/songwriter and musician
Andy Griffin (born 1979), English footballer
Angela Griffin (born 1976), English television actress
Anne Dias-Griffin (born 1971), French/American hedge fund manager
Anthony Griffin (rugby league), Australian rugby league football coach
Anthony Jerome Griffin (1866–1935), American politician
Archie Griffin (born 1954), American football player
Arthur Griffin (disambiguation), several people
AJ Griffin (born 1988), American baseball player

B
Bartholomew Griffin (died 1602), English poet
Becky Griffin (born 1977), Israeli model and actress, and daughter of Bob Griffin
Ben Griffin (disambiguation), several people
Benjamin Griffin (disambiguation), several people
Bernard William Griffin (1899–1956), Cardinal Archbishop of Westminster 1943–56
Bessie Griffin (1922–1989), American Gospel singer

Blake Griffin (born 1989), American basketball player
Bob Griffin (born 1950), American-Israeli basketball player, and English Literature professor, and father of Becky Griffin
Brian C. Griffin (born 1953), American businessman & administrator

C
Cedric Griffin (born 1982), American football player
Charles Griffin (1825–1867), American Union general
Charlie Griffin (born 1979), British footballer
Clarence Griffin (1888–1973), American tennis player
Clive Griffin (born 1964), British singer
Colin Griffin (born 1982), Irish race walker
Colin Griffin (footballer) (born 1956), English footballer
Cornelius Griffin (born 1986), American football player
Cyrus Griffin (1749–1810), American lawyer & administrator

D
Dale "Buffin" Griffin (1948–2016), British musician
Daniel T. Griffin (1911–1941), American Navy pilot
Danny Griffin (footballer) (born 1977), Northern Ireland footballer
David Griffin (disambiguation)
David Ray Griffin (born 1939), philosopher, theologian, and proponent of 9/11 conspiracy theories
Des Griffin, American conspiracy theorist
Dev Griffin (born 1984), British DJ and presenter
Donald Griffin (1915–2003), American zoologist
Doug Griffin (1947–2016), American baseball player
Drew Griffin (1962-2022), American journalist

E
Eddie Griffin, African-American actor and comedian
Edgar Griffin, British politician
Eric Griffin, American rock guitarist
Eric Griffin (basketball) (born 1990), basketball player for Hapoel Be'er Sheva of the Israel Basketball Premier League

F
Floyd Griffin (born 1944), American politician
Forrest Griffin (born 1979), American MMA fighter
Foster Griffin (born 1995), American baseball player
Francis Vielé-Griffin (1864–1937), French poet
Frank Hastings Griffin (1886-1975), American chemist who invented Rayon

G
G. Edward Griffin (born 1931), American film producer, publisher, author and lecturer
Gavin Griffin (born 1981), American poker player
Geoffrey Griffin (cricketer)
Geoffrey William Griffin, youth leader in Kenya
George C. Griffin, American university teacher and administrator
Gerald Griffin, Irish novelist, poet and playwright
 Grey Griffin (alternate name of Grey DeLisle)

H
Harriet Griffin (1903–1991), American mathematician
A. Harry Griffin, journalist and mountaineer
Harry Griffin (cricketer), English cricketer
Hayden Griffin (1943–2013), British stage designer
Helen Griffin (1959–2018), Welsh actress and writer

I
Ian P. Griffin, British astronomer

J
James Bennett Griffin, American archaeologist
James D. Griffin, American politician
Jane Griffin (Lady Franklin)
Jimmy Griffin, American singer and songwriter
John Griffin (disambiguation)
John-Ford Griffin, American professional baseball player
John Griffin Griffin, name used by John Griffin Whitwell, 4th Baron Howard de Walden
John Howard Griffin, American journalist and author
Johnny Griffin, American jazz saxophonist

K
Kathy Griffin, American comedian and actress 
Katie Griffin, Canadian actress and singer
Kelsey Griffin (born 1987), American–Australian basketball player
Kenneth C. Griffin, hedge fund manager and Forbes 400 member
Kenneth W. Griffin (1909–1956), American organist

Kevin Griffin, American singer, songwriter and record producer

L
Larry Griffin, American murderer
Leonard Griffin (soccer), American soccer player
Lois Griffin (Toronto politician)
Lorna Griffin, American sportswoman
Lynne Griffin, Canadian actress
Liam Griffin (disambiguation)

M
Malaika Griffin (born 1971), Anti-white racist convicted of the 1999 murder of Jason Patrick Horsley in Denver, Colorado
Marcus Griffin, American football player
Marion Mahony Griffin, American architect and artist
Martin Griffin (disambiguation)
Marvin Griffin, American politician 
Merv Griffin (1925–2007), entertainer, talk show host, and creator of the television game shows Jeopardy! and Wheel of Fortune
Michael D. Griffin, administrator of NASA
Michael F. Griffin, anti-abortion activist who killed David Gunn
Michael Griffin (American football) (born 1985), American football player
Michael Griffin (Irish priest), murdered during the Irish War for Independence
Miriam T. Griffin, classicist and Fellow of Somerville College, Oxford
Montell Griffin (born 1970), American boxer
Morgan Griffin (born 1992), Australian actress

N
Nick Griffin (born 1959), former chairman of the British National Party
Nonnie Griffin (1933–2019), Canadian stage actress

O
Olaijah Griffin (born 1999), American football player

P
Patrick Griffin (disambiguation), several people
Patty Griffin (born 1964), American singer-songwriter
Paul Griffen (born 1975), New Zealand-born Italian rugby player
Paul Griffin (disambiguation), several people
Peter Griffin (disambiguation), several people

Q
Quentin Griffin (born 1981), American football player

R
Renee Griffin (born 1968), American actress
Richard Griffin and Company, 19th-century Scots publishing house
Richard Allen Griffin (born 1952), American judge
Rick Griffin (1944–1991), American illustrator & cartoonist
Robert Griffin III (born 1990), American football player
Robert P. Griffin (1923–2015), American politician
Roger Griffin (born 1948), British historian
Roger F. Griffin, British astronomer
Ron Griffin (footballer) (1919–1987), English footballer
Ron Griffin (artist) (born 1954), American artist
 Ruth Griffin (1893–1984), American actress better known as Ruth Renick

S
S. A. Griffin (born 1954), American poet & actor
Samuel Griffin (1746–1810), American lawyer & politician
Sandy Griffin (1858–1926), American baseball player
Shaquem Griffin (born 1995), American football player and twin brother of:
Shaquill Griffin (born 1995), also an American football player
Simon Goodell Griffin (1824–1902), American soldier
Steve Griffin (born 1964), American football player
Susan Griffin (born 1943), American author

T
Taylor Griffin (born 1986), American basketball player (and brother of Blake Griffin)
Ted Griffin (born 1970), American screenwriter
Thomas Griffin (politician) (1773–1837), American politician, lawyer and judge
Tom Griffin (disambiguation), several people
Tyrone William Griffin Jr. (born 1985), American musician known professionally as Ty Dolla Sign
Tyson Griffin (born 1984), American martial artist
Todd Griffin, American musician

V
Victor Griffin (1924–2017), Irish Anglican priest and author
Victor William Griffin (c. 1873–1958), Quapaw chief and peyote roadman from Oklahoma

W
W. E. B. Griffin (1929–2019), American author
Walter Burley Griffin (1878–1937), American architect and landscape architect most famous for planning Canberra
William Richard Griffin (1882–1944), American auxiliary bishop of the Diocese of La Crosse
William Michael Griffin (born 1968), hip-hop MC known as Rakim

Fictional characters with the surname
 The Griffin family of Family Guy:
Peter Griffin, father
Lois Griffin, mother
Meg Griffin, daughter and oldest child
Chris Griffin, older son
Stewie Griffin, younger son
Brian Griffin, anthropomorphic pet dog
Francis Griffin, Peter's (adoptive) father
Thelma Griffin, Peter's mother
Karen "Heavy Flo" Griffin, Peter's sister
Griffin (The Invisible Man), fictional character in H. G. Wells' The Invisible Man, first name Jack only in film versions
Judge Jürgen Griffin, a character in the Judge Dredd comic strip
Henry Griffin, a character in The O.C.
Kylie Griffin, a character in Extreme Ghostbusters and in the IDW Ghostbusters comic series
Ric Griffin, a Holby City character played by actor Hugh Quarshie
Sandi Griffin, a character in the animated series Daria
Clarke Griffin, a character in The CW network series The 100
Arthur Griffin, a secondary character in American television series Big Time Rush
Hawley Griffin, a character from The League of Extraordinary Gentlemen

See also
Griffin
Griffin (disambiguation)
Griffin's Foods
Griffin Theatre Company
Griffin Poetry Prize
Griffith (surname)
Webster Griffin Tarpley, journalist

References

 
 O'Laughin, M. C. (1997). "The Book of Irish Families Great & Small". Irish Genealogical Foundation
 Matheson, R. E. (1891). "Special Report on Surnames in Ireland"
 Williams, M. (1996) "Researching Local History"
 U.S. Census Bureau (1990), Population Division, Population Analysis & Evaluation Staff

English-language surnames
Surnames of Irish origin
Anglicised Irish-language surnames
Anglicised Welsh-language surnames